Melecio Figueroa is a Filipino sculptor and engraver whose design was featured in previous coin series of the Philippine peso.

Early life and education
Melecio Figueroa was born on May 24, 1842 in Arevalo, Iloilo to Gabriela Magbanua and Rufo Figueroa. At an early age his mother died, and both he and his sister were sent to live with relatives in Sorsogon. who were cake vendors. As a child, he carved wooden boats and dolls which he gave away to his friends.

The Ayuntamiento of Manila selected him at age 16 as one of the two Filipino artists to be sent to Spain on a scholarship sponsored by Francisco Ahujas, a consul based in the Philippines.

He arrived to Madrid in 1866 where he got himself enrolled at the Escuela de Artes y Officios though he later transferred to the Real Academia de Bellas Artes de San Fernando. When Ahujas, his benefactor died, Figueroa made watch repairing in Madrid as his source of livelihood.  While studying in Spain he won various prizes and recognition for his engravings.

Career
In 1892, he returned to the Philippines to teach engraving at the Escuela de Pintura, Escultura y Grabado in Manila as a professor. He was later appointed engraver in 1893 at the Casa Moneda or colonial mint. Figueroa also continued to repair watches as a side business and opened a silversmith shop in Manila as well. He also attended the Malolos Congress as a delegate and taught at the Liceo de Manila until his death in 1903.

Works

At the Exposicion de Bellas Artes in 1875, Figueroa created a bust of Alfonso XII. His work was recognized and he was given pension. While in Rome he created a bust of Prinsipe d’Odellaski. At the Exposicion de Filipinas in 1887 held in Madrid, he served as a judge and also designed the medals awarded at the event. In 1903, he joined a competition for the Philippine peso coinage system in 1903 and his design was selected as the winner. The coinage system was known as the Conant series, which was named after Charles A. Conant. Figueroa's designs feature in Philippine peso coins until the 1960s.

Figueroa's design was later used for the Great Seal of the U.S. administered Insular Government of the Philippine Islands which was used from 1903 to 1905.

Death
Figueroa died of tuberculosis on July 30, 1903 and was buried in Paco, Manila.

References

Filipino sculptors
1842 births
1903 deaths
People from Iloilo City
People from Sorsogon
Members of the Malolos Congress